Golden Mountains may refer to:

 Golden Mountains (Sudetes), a mountain range in Eastern Sudetes
 Golden Mountains of Altai, an UNESCO World Heritage Site in Siberia
 Golden Mountains (film), a 1931 Soviet film directed by Sergei Yutkevich